Natività della Vergine, also known as "Ceseta Rossa" (Red Chiesetta), is a small Gothic church or oratory, located on Corso Garibaldi in Thiene, Italy. It was erected in 1470 by the aristocratic family Da Porto. It vertical facade echoes the nearby Castle of Thiene (Palazzo Porto Colleoni Thiene).

Sources
Municipal site

Roman Catholic churches completed in 1470
15th-century Roman Catholic church buildings in Italy
 Nativita
Nativita
Thiene